Yuri Nikolaevich Voronov (8 May 1941 – 11 September 1995) was a politician and academic from Abkhazia who was murdered in front of his apartment on the night of 11 September 1995. At the time of his death, he was Vice Premier and a member of the Abkhazian Supreme Soviet.

Early life and career
Yuri Voronov was born on 8 May 1941 in Tsebelda, in the Gulripshi District of the Abkhazian ASSR.

References

People from Gulripshi District
Assassinated Abkhazian politicians
1995 deaths
1941 births
Vice Premiers of Abkhazia
1st convocation of the People's Assembly of Abkhazia
People murdered in Georgia (country)
Caucasologists
1995 murders in Georgia (country)